The 2011 Davidson Wildcats football team represented Davidson College in the 2011 NCAA Division I FCS football season. The Wildcats were led by seventh-year head coach Tripp Merritt and played their home games at Richardson Stadium. They are a member of the Pioneer Football League. They finished the season 4–7, 2–6 in PFL play to finish in a tie for eighth place.

Schedule

References

Davidson
Davidson Wildcats football seasons
Davidson Wildcats football